From the Bush is a compilation album of Australian Indigenous bands released in Australia by CAAMA in 1990.  It was nominated for a 1991 ARIA Award for Best Indigenous Release.

Rough Guides calls it "a fine introduction to the contemporary music of Central Australia's desert regions and sparse townships." Penelope Layland writing in the Canberra Times gave it a mostly negative review, saying most of the album was "fairly standard music" and "run-of-the-mill musical forms" but noting the better songs "those which incorporate at least some elements of traditional Aboriginal music or traditional instrumentation".

Accolades

Track listing

 Don't worry just be happy – Blekbala Mujik
 Tjana anu wilurara – Chrysophrase
 Hermannsburg Mountain – Irwin Inkamala & the Country lads
 Mardaka nyanu – North Tanami Band
 She's my sister – Daryl Smith
 Seasons coming – Areyonga Desert Tigers
 Tjitji tjuta wankanyi – Titjikala Desert Oaks Band
 To leave this young black girl – Wairuk Band
 We’re the Wedgetail Eagles – Wedgetail Eagle Band
 Pitjantjatjara Boy Like Me – Isaac Yamma
 Pitulu (Petrol) – Punch Thompson
 Mount Doreen – Western Desert Band
 Blackmans crying – Frank Yamma
 Alice don't grow so fast – Amunda
 Dreamtime blues – Bill Wellington
 I'm telling you – Irwin Inkamala & the Country Lads
 Black Boy – Wedgetail Eagle Band
 Lajamanu – North Tanami Band
 Nitmiluk – Blekbala Mujik
Tracks 1,4,9,12,16,18 and 19 only appear on the cd version.

References

Compilation albums by Australian artists